Piramal Realty is an Indian real estate company, founded in 2012 by Anand Piramal. It is a part of Piramal Group, headquartered in Mumbai, India. The company is engaged in developing luxury residential and commercial properties and is currently developing projects estimated to cover 15 million square feet. Among its notable projects include Piramal Aranya, Piramal Mahalaxmi, Piramal Revanta, Piramal Vaikunth and Piramal Agastya.

History 
The company was founded in 2012 by Anand Piramal as a real estate arm of Piramal Group led by Ajay Piramal.

In July 2015, Piramal Realty raised $234 million from private equity firms Warburg Pincus and Goldman Sachs, making it one of the largest investment in India's real estate sector.

The company has made several high-value land acquisitions in India. In April 2012, it acquired a sea-facing property from Hindustan Unilever Limited in Worli, Mumbai, for 452 crore. In June 2011, Piramal Realty acquired a 7-acre plot in Byculla from Mafatlal Industries for 605.80 crores, however, Business Today reports it to be 753 crores. It purchased 3.2 acres of land parcel in Mulund from rival Nirmal Lifestyles for 153 crores in 2017.

In January 2018, it formed a joint venture with Omkar Realty to develop a 12-acre luxury housing project at Mahalaxmi in South Mumbai, where Piramal Realty invested ₹2,600 crores. The company made another JV with Omkar in 2019 to build a residential project in Mahim with a total investment of  3,000 crores.

The company tied up with companies like Kohn Pedersen Fox, Fosters, Make, HOK and Callison to execute projects. It has partnered with structural consultants Buro Happold, security firm Max Security and vertical transportation company Lerch Bates.

Piramal Realty signed actor Farhan Akhtar and cricketer Rahul Dravid as its brand ambassadors for projects in the Mumbai Metropolitan Region in 2021.

Awards and recognition

References 

Real estate companies of India
Real estate companies established in 2012
2012 establishments in Maharashtra
Indian companies established in 2012
Real estate companies based in Mumbai
Companies based in Mumbai